William Beresford (17 April 1797 – 6 October 1883) was a British Conservative politician.

Background
He was the only son of Marcus Beresford and his wife Frances Arabella, daughter of Joseph Leeson, 1st Earl of Milltown. Beresford was educated at St Mary Hall, Oxford, where he graduated with a Bachelor of Arts in 1819 and a Master of Arts five years later. He joined the British Army and served in the 9th Queen's Royal Lancers and then in the 12th (Prince of Wales's) Royal Lancers, finally as a major.

Career
Beresford contested County Waterford unsuccessfully in 1837. He was elected for Harwich in the next general election in 1841, which he represented until 1847. Beresford and Charles Newdegate were the Conservative whips in the House of Commons after the party split over the Corn Laws. His relations with Benjamin Disraeli were strained, with Beresford often taking his cue from Lord Stanley in the Lords instead of the nominal leader in the commons. As Chief Whip he managed the 1852 general election, widely noted for its venality (even by the standards of the day), and was censured by the house for "reckless indifference to systematic bribery". Disraeli took the opportunity to remove Beresford, who was briefly succeeded as whip by William Forbes Mackenzie. Mackenzie, however, lost his seat for much the same reason, and was in turn succeeded by Sir William Joliffe. The management of elections Disraeli transferred to his solicitor, Philip Rose. Beresford was appointed Secretary at War in 1852, and on this occasion was sworn in as a Privy Counsellor.

Family
In 1833, he married Catherine, the youngest daughter of George Robert Heneage, and had by her two sons and a daughter.

Notes

References

External links
 

1797 births
1883 deaths
Alumni of St Mary Hall, Oxford
Conservative Party (UK) MPs for English constituencies
Members of the Privy Council of the United Kingdom
UK MPs 1841–1847
UK MPs 1847–1852
UK MPs 1852–1857
UK MPs 1857–1859
UK MPs 1859–1865
William
9th Queen's Royal Lancers officers
12th Royal Lancers officers